Danilo Ditrich (born May 15, 1995) is a German footballer who plays as a defensive midfielder for TSV Kornburg.

References

External links

1995 births
Living people
German footballers
3. Liga players
Regionalliga players
Association football midfielders
SpVgg Ansbach players
SpVgg Unterhaching players
SpVgg Unterhaching II players
1. FC Nürnberg players
VfL Wolfsburg II players
SV Eintracht Trier 05 players
SV Seligenporten players
FC Rot-Weiß Erfurt players
People from Ansbach
Sportspeople from Middle Franconia
Footballers from Bavaria